Pandua Assembly constituency is an assembly constituency in Hooghly district in the Indian state of West Bengal.

Overview
As per orders of the Delimitation Commission, No. 192 Pandua Assembly constituency is composed of the following: Pandua community development block.

Pandua Assembly constituency is part of No. 28 Hooghly (Lok Sabha constituency). It was earlier part of Katwa (Lok Sabha constituency).

Members of Legislative Assembly

Election results

2021

2016

2011

1977–2006
In the 2006 2001 and 1996 state assembly elections Sk Majed Ali of CPI (M) won the Pandua assembly seat, defeating his nearest rivals Alam Kazi Rowshan of Trinamool Congress, Sailen Chatterjee of  Trinamool Congress and Madhusudan Banerjee of Congress, in the respective years. Contests in most years were multi cornered but only winners and runners are being mentioned. Deb Narayan Chakraborty of CPI (M) won the seat in 1991, 1987, 1982 and 1977 defeating his nearest rivals, Hrishikesh Ghosh of Congress in 1991 and 1987, Haren Singha Roy of Congress in 1982 and Sailendra Chattopadhya of Congress in 1977.

1962–1972
Sailendra Chattopadhyay of Congress won in 1972. Debnarayan Chakraborty of CPI(M) won in 1971 and 1969. R.Kundu of Congress won in 1967. Radha Nath Das of Congress won in 1962. Prior to that the Pandua seat did not exist.

References

Assembly constituencies of West Bengal
Politics of Hooghly district